Heaven Without Love ("a crack in heaven") is a Serbian-language Croatian drama film directed by Vladimir Pogačić, adapted from a novel by Milan Tuturov. It was released in 1959. The film was poorly received.

Plot
In Belgrade, Marija, a pharmacy student (Ljubica Jović) marries a medicine student, Slobodan Marković (Milan Puzić), in order to solve her existential issues. They grow older and their relationship changes. Slobodan abuses and ignores her, convinces her to have an abortion as she gets pregnant, and cheats on her with a nurse, so she starts a tragic love affair with Pavle Borovac (Antun Vrdoljak), a young journalist whom she meets at a beach.

Cast
 Ljubica Jović as Marija Marković
 Milan Puzić as Slobodan Marković
 Tatjana Beljakova as Branka
 Severin Bijelić as Inspector Naumović
 Antun Vrdoljak as Pavle Borovac
 Branko Tatić as Obrad Kratić
 Zoran Longinović as Police Department Chief

Reception
The film was poorly received upon its release and was criticised for its perceived advocacy of Jean-Paul Sartre's philosophy. Utilising psychological realism, the film was part of a trend of decreasing emphasis on ideology and regime compliance in Communist cinema towards the late 1950s. Tomislav Šakić of Kino Tuškanac likens the film to Orson Welles' Citizen Kane in its form as it tells the story from the point of view of a police investigation, and considers it an early feminist film for its portrayal of abortion.

References

External links
 

1959 films
1950s Croatian-language films
Films directed by Vladimir Pogačić
Jadran Film films
Croatian romantic drama films
Films set in Belgrade
1959 drama films
Yugoslav romantic drama films